Pellaea is a genus of stink bugs in the family Pentatomidae. There is at least one described species in Pellaea, P. stictica.

References

Further reading

 
 
 

Pentatomidae genera
Pentatomini